The 1898 Cork Senior Hurling Championship was the 12th staging of the Cork Senior Hurling Championship since its establishment by the Cork County Board in 1887.

Blackrock were the defending champions.

On 11 September 1898, Blackrock won the championship following a 2-9 to 0-2 defeat of Carrigtwohill in the final. This was their eighth championship title overall and their second title in succession.

Results

Semi-finals

Final

References

Cork Senior Hurling Championship
Cork Senior Hurling Championship